Xuan Thanh Saigon Cement was a Vietnam professional football club based in Ho Chi Minh City, active from 2010 to 2013.

Their home stadium was Thong Nhat Stadium.

Honours

National competitions
League
 V.League 1:
 Third place : 2012
 V.League 2:
 Winners : 2011
Cup
 Vietnamese National Cup:
 Winners : 2012

Season-by-season record

Performance in AFC competitions
AFC Cup: 1 appearance
2013: Group stage

References

Association football clubs established in 2010
Football clubs in Vietnam
Football clubs in Ho Chi Minh City
Association football clubs disestablished in 2013